Sonia Franquet is a Spanish female sport shooter. At the 2008, 2012 and 2016 Summer Olympics, she competed in the Women's 10 metre air pistol and Women's 25 metre pistol.

References

Spanish female sport shooters
Living people
Olympic shooters of Spain
Shooters at the 2008 Summer Olympics
Shooters at the 2012 Summer Olympics
Shooters at the 2016 Summer Olympics
Shooters at the 2015 European Games
European Games silver medalists for Spain
European Games medalists in shooting
Year of birth missing (living people)
Shooters at the 2019 European Games
21st-century Spanish women